1968 in the Philippines details events of note that happened in the Philippines in 1968.

Incumbents

 President: Ferdinand Marcos (Nacionalista Party)
 Vice President: Fernando Lopez (Nacionalista Party)
House Speaker: José Laurel, Jr.
 Chief Justice: Roberto Concepcion
 Congress: 6th

Events

March
 March 18 – Jabidah massacre takes place when Army soldiers murdered a number of Moro recruits through machine gunfire in Corregidor Island in retaliation to the planned invasion of Sabah.

August
 August 2 – The 1968 Casiguran earthquake occurred with a moment magnitude of 7.6 and a maximum Mercalli intensity of IX (Violent). The earthquake's epicenter was located in Casiguran, Aurora. This was deemed the most destructive earthquake in the Philippines prior to the 1990 Luzon earthquake.

September
 September 18 – The Republic Act No. 5446 takes effect which regards Sabah as part of the Philippines.

December
 December 26 – The CPP is founded under the guidance of Marxism-Leninism-Maoism by Joma Sison.

Holidays

As per Act No. 2711 section 29, issued on March 10, 1917, any legal holiday of fixed date falls on Sunday, the next succeeding day shall be observed as legal holiday. Sundays are also considered legal religious holidays. Bonifacio Day was added through Philippine Legislature Act No. 2946. It was signed by then-Governor General Francis Burton Harrison in 1921. On October 28, 1931, the Act No. 3827 was approved declaring the last Sunday of August as National Heroes Day. As per Republic Act No. 3022, April 9th is proclaimed as Bataan Day. Independence Day was changed from July 4 (Philippine Republic Day) to June 12 (Philippine Independence Day) on August 4, 1964.

 January 1 – New Year's Day
 February 22 – Legal Holiday
 April 9 – Araw ng Kagitingan (Day of Valor)
 April 11 – Maundy Thursday
 April 12 – Good Friday
 May 1 – Labor Day
 June 12 – Independence Day 
 July 4 – Philippine Republic Day
 August 13  – Legal Holiday
 August 25  – National Heroes Day
 November 28 – Thanksgiving Day
 November 30 – Bonifacio Day
 December 25 – Christmas Day
 December 30 – Rizal Day

Entertainment and culture
 December 18 – ABS-CBN opens its present-day headquarters, the ABS-CBN Broadcasting Center on Bohol Avenue (renamed as Sgt. Esguerra Avenue in 1989), Quezon City, the most advanced broadcast facility in the country during that time.

Sports
 October 12–27 – The Philippines participates in the 1968 Summer Olympics with 49 competitors in ten sports.

Births
January 20 – Gerry Alanguilan, comic book author (d. 2019)
March 1 – Mon Confiado, actor
March 3 – Edwin Ongchuan, Filipino politician
April 13 – Lani Mercado, actress and incumbent Mayor of Bacoor
April 23 – Juan Miguel Zubiri, Filipino Representative and senator
April 24 – Anjo Yllana, actor, comedian, TV host and politician
May 6 – Joyce Bernal, film and television director
May 12 – Herbert Bautista, actor, and mayor of Quezon City
May 21 – Julie Vega, child actress and singer (d. 1985)
June 3 – Luis Raymund Villafuerte, politician
June 15 – Paul Alvarez, basketball player 
June 21 – Jett Pangan, singer
June 29 – Robbie Guevara, actor, director, producer
July 7 – Dingdong Avanzado, singer and actor 
July 15 – Julius Babao, anchor
August 15 – Esmael Mangudadatu, politician
September 3 – Grace Poe, senator and former chairwoman of MTRCB
October 2 – Benjie Paras, basketball player, actor, and comedian
November 9 – Janice de Belen, actress
November 15 – Teodoro Casiño, journalist and politician
November 20 – Princess Punzalan, actress
December 11 – Eula Valdez, actress
December 26 – John Feir, actor and comedian

Deaths
February 21 – Vicente Duterte, Filipino politician and lawyer, father of the 16th President of the Philippines, Rodrigo Duterte (b. 1911)
February 11 – Efren Reyes, Sr., Filipino actor (b. 1924)
May 8 – Telesforo Trinidad, Filipino fireman in the United States Navy and recipient of the Medal of Honor (b. 1890)
September 20 – Higino A. Acala, Sr., Filipino lawyer (b. 1925)

References